Philippe Eidel (22 December 1956 – 6 September 2018) was a French music producer, writer and film music composer.

References

External links 
 
 Philippe Eidel official web site
 Philippe Eidel

1956 births
2018 deaths
French record producers
People from Antananarivo
French people of Malagasy descent